Azhagan is a 1991 Indian Tamil-language drama film directed by K. Balachander and produced by Kovai Chezhiyan. It stars Mammootty, in lead role with an ensemble supporting cast.  The film, released on 25 August 1991, was critically and commercially successful.

Plot 
Azhagappan a successful hotelier and father of four small children has lost his wife (whose face is not shown in the photo) in an accident. College student Swapna plays pranks on him and also falls in love with him, but Azhagappan refuses her love considering the age difference between them. After passing the matriculation exam, Azhagappan enrolls in a tutorial center where his teacher Kanmani is smitten with him, but Azhagappan is not interested in her. Classical dancers Priya Ranjan and Azhagappan though, fall in love. After egos and differences crop up between them, Driver Santhanam blurts out the truth that the four children are orphans adopted by him. In the end, Swapna understands the situation and would love to call him "Daddy". With the help of Kanmani and Swapna, the four children devise a plan and play mediator between Azhagan and Priya by making them speak on the phone. In the end, both reveal their love through the phone and get united in the end.

Cast 

Mammootty as Azhagappan
Bhanupriya as Priya Ranjan
Madhoo as Swapna
Geetha as Kanmani
Babloo Prithiveeraj as Azhagappan's servant
Sowcar Janaki as Doctor
K. S. Jayalakshmi as Swapna's teacher
Sujitha as Baby (Azhagappan's daughter)
Robert as Anand (Azhagappan's son)
Vikranth as Azhagappan's son
Tinku as Durai (Azhagappan's son)
Charle as Television Anchor
Peeli Sivam as Inspector Selvaraj
Suresh Chakravarthi as Agarapattanam Sokku
Sonia as Kanmani's sister
Kavithalaya Krishnan
Ramya Krishnan in cameo appearance
R. Sundaramoorthy as Manoharan
Yuvarani
Gowtham Sundararajan as dancer in song "Kozhi Koovum"

Production 
Madhoo, niece of actress Hema Malini made her acting debut with this film. The song "Kozhi Koovum" was choreographed by Kala and was picturised within two days.

Soundtrack 
The music was scored by Maragadha Mani. The song "Thathithom" is based on Dharmavati raga, "Sangeetha Swarangal" is based on Kharaharapriya, and "Jaadhi Malli" is based on Maand.

Reception 
The Indian Express wrote, "Balachander while charting out a script bristles with very lifelike characters acting out their hopes and fears with much credibility does not miss out on smaller details." The film was both a critical and commercial success. At the Tamil Nadu State Film Awards, Maragathamani won the award for Best Music Director, while Raghunatha Reddy won for Best Cinematographer.

References

External links 

1990s Tamil-language films
1991 drama films
1991 films
Films about widowhood in India
Films directed by K. Balachander
Films scored by M. M. Keeravani
Films with screenplays by K. Balachander
Indian drama films